The American Time Use Survey (ATUS), sponsored by the Bureau of Labor Statistics (BLS) and conducted by the United States Census Bureau (USCB), is a time-use survey which provides measures of the amounts of time people spend on various activities, including working, leisure, childcare, and household activities. The survey has been conducted annually since 2003.

Methodology
Eligible survey participants are households that have completed all eight months of the Current Population Survey (CPS). Of the eligible households, those representing a range of demographic characteristics are selected to participate in the survey. Between 2–5 months after the household's eighth and final CPS interview, one randomly-selected person of at least fifteen years of age is selected from each household to be interviewed for the ATUS and asked questions about their time use.

Sample size
Since December 2003, the ATUS sample has been 2,190 households per month (approximately 26,400 households per year). The ATUS sample was initially 3,375 households per month (approximately 40,500 households per year), but was reduced to lower costs. The selected households are categorized into one of twelve strata based on race/ethnicity (Hispanic, Non-Hispanic black, Non-Hispanic non-black) and household type (child under age six, child between age six and age seventeen, single adult no children, two or more adults no children).

Data
The ATUS data includes:
 Time spent by the civilian population in primary activities, including daily averages by age, sex, race, Hispanic or Latino ethnicity, marital status, and educational attainment, averages for weekdays vs weekends and holidays, and averages by time of day
 Time spent by employed persons working and working at home or at their workplace, by full-time and part-time status and sex, jobholding status, educational attainment, class of worker, earnings, industry, occupation, time of day, and day of week
 Time spent by married mothers and married fathers in primary activities, including averages by employment status
 Time spent by over age eighteen civilian population in primary activities by age of youngest household child and sex, for employed vs non-employed
 Time spent in leisure and sports by selected characteristics

From 2005–2010, the ATUS included questions relating to overnight trips. In January 2011, the overnight trips questions were replaced by questions relating to eldercare.

Modules
The ATUS sometimes includes special questions, called modules, at the end of the interview. The ATUS added an Eating & Health module from 2006–2008 and 2014–2016, a Well-Being Module in 2010, 2012, and 2013, and a Leave module, relating to workers' access to leave, in 2011.

Data uses
ATUS data is used by the Bureau of Economic Analysis (BEA) to account for the value of household production, the Bureau of Transportation Statistics (BTS) in their Passenger Travel: Facts and Figures report, and the Economic Research Service (ERS) to examine how time use patterns of eating affect health.

ATUS data has also been used to help research worker productivity, social isolation, and how working parents balance the activities in their lives.

See also
 List of household surveys in the United States
 Time-use survey

References

External links
 American Time Use Survey

Bureau of Labor Statistics
Reports of the Bureau of Labor Statistics
Household surveys